Nagoya Stadium (ナゴヤ球場) was a stadium in Nagoya, Japan.  It was primarily used for baseball and was home of the Chunichi Dragons until they moved to the Nagoya Dome in 1997.  The stadium opened in 1948 and had a capacity of 35,000 people.

External links
Stadium information 

Sports venues in Nagoya
Defunct baseball venues in Japan
Chunichi Dragons
Sports venues completed in 1948
1948 establishments in Japan